Bonifacio (or  ;) is a commune in the southern tip of the island of Corsica, in the French department of Corse-du-Sud.

Bonifacio is the setting of Guy de Maupassant's short story "Vendetta".

The French leg of the Red Bull Cliff Diving World Series takes place in Bonifacio.

Geography

Bonifacio is located directly on the Mediterranean Sea, separated from Sardinia by the Strait of Bonifacio. It is a city placed on the best and only major harbour of the southern coast and also is a commune covering a somewhat larger region including the offshore Isles Lavezzi, giving it the distinction of being the southernmost commune in Metropolitan France. The commune is bordered on the northwest by the canton of Figari and has a short border on the northeast with the canton of Porto-Vecchio. The combined border runs approximately from the Golfe de Ventilegne on the west to the mouth of the Golfu di Sant'Amanza on the east. Highway N198 runs north along the east coast and N196 along the west.

The islands are part of the French portion, of the international Bouches de Bonifacio ("Strait of Bonifacio") marine park, a nature reserve, signed into legal existence by France and Italy in 1993 for the protection of the strait against passage of ships bearing dangerous chemicals, and implemented in France by a ministerial decree of 1999 detailing the land to be included in the réserve naturelle de Bouches de Bonifacio for the preservation of wild birds, other fauna and flora, fish and nature in general.

The southern coast in the vicinity of Bonifacio is an outcrop of chalk-white limestone, precipitous and sculpted into unusual shapes by the ocean. Slightly further inland the limestone adjoins the granite of which the two islands, Sardinia and Corsica, are formed. In prehistoric post-glacial times when sea levels were low and the islands were connected, the ravine was part of a valley leading to upland Corsica.

The city of Bonifacio is split into two sections. The vieille ville (old town), or la Haute Ville (the Upper city), on the site of a citadel, is located on the promontory overlooking the Mediterranean Sea. The citadel was built in the 9th century with the foundation of the city. The Citadel has been reconstructed and renovated many times since its construction and most recently was an administrative center for the French Foreign Legion. Today it is more of a museum. Historically most of the inhabitants have resided in the Haute ville under the immediate protection of the citadel. The harbour facilities and residential areas below, la marine, line the narrow shelf of the inlet and extend for some distance up the valley, giving the settlement a linear appearance and creating a third residential section limited by St. Julien on the east.

The city and its fortifications also extend for some distance along the cliff-tops, which are at about  elevation. The cliffs have been undercut by the ocean so that the buildings, which have been placed on the very lip of the precipice, appear to overhang it. The appearance from the sea is of a white city gleaming in the sun and suspended over the rough waters below.

History

Prehistoric period
Bonifacio has two prehistoric sites of some importance: the ancient cave shelter of Araguina-Sennola near the village of Capello on Route N96 just north of the city and a chambered tomb of Vasculacciu further north near Figari. The first is the site of the notable Lady of Bonifacio, a female burial carbon-dated to about 6570 BC, which is either late Mesolithic or Early Neolithic, and the second belongs to the Megalithic Culture and is dated to the Middle Neolithic. The alignment of the two and the extensive use of chert from Monte Arci in Sardinia shows that the Bay of Bonifacio was a route to inland Corsica from the earliest times.

Roman period
The only record of southernmost Corsica in Roman times comes from the geographer Ptolemy. He reports the coordinates of Marianum Promontory and town, which, plotted on a map, turn out to be the farthest south of Corsica. After listing the peoples of the east coast he states that the Subasani (ancient Greek Soubasanoi) were "more to the south."

The people do not appear subsequently and the town and promontory have not been identified, nor do any Roman roads point to it. The only official road, the Via Corsica, ran between the Roman castra of Mariana and Aleria on the east coast and further south to Pallas, according to the Antonine Itinerary. Ptolemy places Pallas unequivocally on the east coast north of Marianum. Although unrecorded tracks and paths to the far south are possible, it is unlikely they would have carried any significant Roman traffic.

Maritime traffic through the strait however was significant and it could hardly have neglected the fine harbour at Bonifacio. A second possibility would be the first century AD Roman ruins adjoining Piantarella Beach near the village of Ciappili and next to the grounds of Sperone golf course, a recreational suburb to the west of Bonifacio, but those ruins appear to represent a Roman villa and the beach though eminently suitable for recreation is of little value as a port. More likely the villa belonged to a citizen of Bonifacio as Marianum.

Tuscan period
Corsica was taken from the Roman Empire in 469 AD by Genseric, king of the Vandals, and recovered by the Eastern Empire in 534. The Lombards having taken it again in 725, Charlemagne cleared them out by 774 and handed the island over to the Papacy, which had been the most powerful complainant of the island's devastation by Germanics. Starting in 806 the Moors of Spain began to contend for the island and held it for a short time but in 828 the Papacy assigned its defense to the margrave of Tuscany, a powerful state of the Holy Roman Empire nominally under the Kingdom of Italy.

The city in evidence today was founded as a fortress by and subsequently named after Boniface II of Tuscany in 828. He had led a naval expedition to suppress the Saracens of North Africa and returned to build an unassailable fortress and naval base from which the domains of Tuscany could be defended at the outermost frontier. Most of the citadel postdates the 9th century or is of uncertain date but Il Torrione, a round tower, was certainly part of the original citadel.

Climate

Bonifacio has a hot-summer Mediterranean climate (Köppen climate classification Csa).

Population

Sights
The town's charm and proximity to idyllic beaches makes it a popular tourist destination in the summer, predominantly for residents of mainland France.

Two Genoese towers are in the neighbourhood:
Torra di Sant' Amanza
Torra di Sponsaglia
Église Saint-Dominique de Bonifacio
Église Sainte-Marie-Majeure de Bonifacio

Beaches and recreation

La Tonnara Beach

Transportation
The town is served by Figari airport (car or taxi required), and ferry service to Sardinia is available multiple times daily.

Personalities
The following persons of note were born in Bonifacio:
Tommaso Maria Zigliara (1833–1893), Roman Catholic cardinal, theologian, and philosopher.
The film star Marie-José Nat.

See also
Communes of the Corse-du-Sud department

References

External links

 Official website of Tourist Office of Bonifacio (English/French/German/Italian/Spanish)
 magnificent panorama of Bonifacio 

 Bonifacio 
 Bonifacio Corsica Independent travel guide to the stylish town of Bonifacio, Corsica. 

Communes of Corse-du-Sud
Corse-du-Sud communes articles needing translation from French Wikipedia